Beşiktaş is a currently under construction underground metro station located on the M7 line of the Istanbul Metro, Currently on hold due to archeological excavation, and it is planned to have a museum in the station when completed. It is planned to be open in 2024, as there have also been archeological sites discovered at the Kabataş station.

Layout

References

Rapid transit stations under construction in Turkey
Railway stations scheduled to open in 2024
Istanbul metro stations